The South Carolina State Transport Police Division (STP) of the South Carolina Department of Public Safety is primarily responsible for enforcing state and federal laws governing commercial motor vehicles. The major objectives are to protect the motoring public by (1) preventing accidents,(2) removing unsafe drivers and vehicles from our roads, (3) protecting our environment from hazardous materials being transported on our roadways and (4) preventing the premature deterioration of our roads and bridges through the STP Size and Weight Enforcement Program.

STP is divided into field enforcement and special operations unit.  The Special Operations Unit consists of three units which concentrates on three specific areas.

The Strategic Traffic Alcohol and Radar (STAR) unit targets traffic violations and drivers under the influence of alcohol and drugs.

The Hazardous Materials unit monitors the transporting and shipping of dangerous and toxic materials through our state.

The Commercial Vehicle Investigative unit conducts shipper and carrier compliance reviews.  Field Enforcement focuses on state and federal size and weight limits, and safety regulation in the seven districts throughout the state.

STP utilizes the latest in technology with 90% of its field enforcement staff equipped with laptop computers, the use of marked, semi-marked and unmarked vehicles.  STP officers work with semi-portable and portable scales, and work out of fixed scale facilities.

See also

South Carolina Highway Patrol
South Carolina Department of Public Safety
List of law enforcement agencies in South Carolina

External links
SCSTP Website

State law enforcement agencies of South Carolina
Specialist police departments of South Carolina
1993 establishments in South Carolina